Zachary Harris Johnson (born February 24, 1976) is an American professional golfer who has 12 victories on the PGA Tour, including two major championships, the 2007 Masters and the 2015 Open Championship.

In 2023, Johnson will captain the U.S. Ryder Cup squad against Europe in Rome, Italy.

Early life
The son of a chiropractor, Johnson was born in Iowa City, Iowa and raised in Cedar Rapids, the eldest of Dave and Julie Johnson's three children.  Playing many sports as a youth (baseball, basketball, football, and soccer), Johnson took up golf at age 10 and developed his skills at Elmcrest Country Club.  He played number-two on the Regis High School golf team and led them to an Iowa 3A state championship in 1992, his sophomore year.

Following graduation from high school in 1994, Johnson enrolled at Drake University in Des Moines. As the number-two player on the Drake golf team, he led the Bulldogs to three NCAA regional meets and two Missouri Valley championships. Johnson's uncle, Tom Harris, qualified for the 1975 NAIA national tournament.

Professional career
Johnson turned professional in 1998 and played on the developmental tour circuit, including the now-defunct Prairie Golf Tour, Buy.com Tour (now Korn Ferry Tour), and Hooters Tour, where he won the final three regular-season events in 2001. In 2003, he topped the money list on the Nationwide Tour with then record earnings of $494,882, earning an automatic promotion to the PGA Tour.

Johnson won his first PGA Tour event in 2004 at the BellSouth Classic outside of Atlanta, one stroke ahead of runner-up Mark Hensby. In 2006, Johnson recorded a number of impressive results, with two runner-ups and a third at the WGC-Accenture Match Play Championship. As a result, he qualified for the U.S. Ryder Cup team for the first time in 2006, finishing ninth on the U.S. points list.

In April 2007, Johnson won his first major title at the Masters Tournament in Augusta, two strokes ahead of runners-up Tiger Woods, Retief Goosen, and Rory Sabbatini. His score of 289 (+1) tied Sam Snead (1954) and Jack Burke Jr. (1956) for the highest winning score at the Masters. His victory took Johnson from #56 to #15 in the world rankings; he was the first outside the top 50 in the world rankings to win the Masters in the history of the rankings (introduced 1986). After winning, he mentioned his Christian faith and thanked God, saying: "This being Easter, I cannot help but believe my Lord and Savior, Jesus Christ was walking with me. I owe this to Him."

Six weeks after winning the Masters, Johnson won for the third time on tour at the AT&T Classic in a playoff over Ryuji Imada. Following the win, Johnson moved to 13th in the world rankings. His next PGA Tour victory, and first outside the state of Georgia, came at the Valero Texas Open in October 2008, where he finished with weekend rounds of 62 and 64 to finish two strokes ahead of a chasing pack of players.

Johnson won the Sony Open in Hawaii in January 2009 for his fifth victory on the PGA Tour, and successfully defended his title at the Valero Texas Open in May with a playoff victory over James Driscoll. With a third-round 60, Johnson became the first player to shoot 60 twice on the PGA Tour, having done so previously at the 2007 Tour Championship. The win was Johnson's sixth on tour. Other highlights in 2009 include a tie for 2nd place at the John Deere Classic and a solo 3rd-place finish at the Arnold Palmer Invitational. He finished the season ranked a career best fourth on the money list.

In 2010, Johnson started the season solidly on the PGA Tour, making ten of his first eleven cuts without any significant results. Then in June 2010, he won the Crowne Plaza Invitational at Colonial, his seventh PGA Tour victory. Johnson only missed two cuts all year en route to qualifying for the season ending Tour Championship and the 2010 U.S. Ryder Cup team, his second appearance in the event.

In 2012, Johnson won the Crowne Plaza Invitational at Colonial for the second time in his career. He made a  putt on the last hole for an apparent three-shot victory, but a ruling on the final hole resulted in a two-stroke penalty. It did not affect the outcome, with the only difference being Johnson signing for a double-bogey instead of a par on the final hole, and winning by a single stroke over Jason Dufner. He jumped to 3rd in the FedEx Cup standings and returned to the world top 20 with this victory.

Johnson moved to second in the FedEx Cup standings in 2012 with a playoff win on July 15 at the John Deere Classic. Johnson defeated Troy Matteson, who started the day up four shots on Johnson and had led the tournament since the first round, with a birdie on the second hole of their playoff. Johnson also started the day behind three-time defending champion Steve Stricker, who was three shots behind Matteson. It was Johnson's second win on the year after winning at Colonial Country Club. Mike Bender, Johnson's swing coach, also caddied for the week while usual caddie Damon Green played in the U.S. Senior Open.

At the 2012 Open Championship, played at Royal Lytham & St Annes Golf Club in Lancashire, England, Johnson finished at even par for the tournament (280), tied for ninth, seven shots behind winner Ernie Els.

In 2013, Johnson, in defense of his John Deere Classic title, lost in a three-man sudden-death playoff to Jordan Spieth at the fifth extra hole, after he bogeyed the final hole of regulation play with a one shot lead. In the playoff, all three players, Johnson, Spieth and David Hearn, had chances to win with Johnson's coming at the second extra hole, but he failed to convert the putt. Spieth won with par at the fifth extra hole after Johnson hit his second shot into the water and could only make bogey.

The following week, Johnson opened up the 2013 Open Championship at Muirfield, with a five-under-par round of 66 to hold the lead by one stroke over Rafa Cabrera-Bello and Mark O'Meara. He finished the tournament in a tie for 6th place.

He continued solid play for the rest of the summer, finishing in the top-10 in six of the next seven tournaments he would enter, including an 8th-place finish at the PGA Championship, making it back to back top-10 finishes at major events. In September, Johnson captured the BMW Championship for his tenth career victory and first FedEx Cup victory of his career.

In December 2013, Johnson attained a playoff victory over Tiger Woods at the Northwestern Mutual World Challenge. This win moved him into the top ten of the Official World Golf Ranking for the first time in his career.

Johnson captured his 11th career victory in January 2014 with a win at the Hyundai Tournament of Champions. With the win, Johnson moved up to a career high 7th in the Official World Golf Ranking.

At the 2014 U.S. Open, Johnson had a hole in one on the 172 yard par-3 9th hole.  It was the 44th hole in one in U.S. Open history, and just the second at Pinehurst No. 2.

On July 20, 2015, Johnson beat Louis Oosthuizen and Marc Leishman in a four-hole playoff to win the Open Championship at St Andrews for his 12th PGA Tour win and second major. He became only the sixth golfer to win majors at Augusta and St. Andrews, the others being Sam Snead, Jack Nicklaus, Nick Faldo, Seve Ballesteros, and Woods.

Johnson is one of only two players (with Phil Mickelson) to have twice shot a round of 60 on the PGA Tour, though Jim Furyk shot rounds of 58 and 59.

In July 2019, Johnson fell out of the Official World Golf Ranking top 100 players for the first time since April 2004, when his first tour victory at the 2004 BellSouth Classic vaulted him from 126th in the world to 49th. From 2004 to 2018, Johnson made at least $1.6 million every season, and he grabbed wins in all but one season between 2007 and 2015. The only year he didn't, 2011, Johnson still managed to finish T-6 or better in four events, and he also finished solo second at the Hero World Challenge.

In August 2019, Johnson failed to make the FedEx Cup Playoffs for the first time since the playoffs were introduced in 2007. "Extreme disappointment. That's about all I've got at this point is just extreme disappointment," Johnson said. "I mean, I didn’t play as much as I typically do in the past, probably 3-5 tournaments less, but that's just because of the season of life that I'm in. So there's more opportunity when you play more, but that has nothing to do with my play." Once a fixture near the top of the rankings, Johnson slipped to 126th in the world. He remains fully exempt for the 2019–20 PGA Tour season in the final part of a five-year exemption for winning the 2015 Open Championship, an insurance that the 43-year-old admitted allowed him to play with added "freedom" during a lean year.

In July 2021, Johnson was forced to withdraw from 2021 Open Championship after testing positive for COVID-19, ending his streak at participating in 69 consecutive majors.

Personal life
Johnson and his wife, the former Kim Barclay, were members of First Baptist Church in Orlando.

Johnson was raised a Catholic, but joined his wife's church prior to their marriage in 2003. They have two sons, Will and Wyatt, and one daughter, Abby Jane. They lived in Lake Mary, Florida and now reside in St. Simons, Georgia.

Johnson won the Payne Stewart Award in 2020.

He is not to be confused with golf club professional Zach J. Johnson.

Foundation
The Zach Johnson Foundation is dedicated to helping children and their families in Cedar Rapids, Iowa. One program created by Johnson and his wife Kim helped to raise $700,000 for community agencies serving children in need. He has stated: "This Foundation will fulfill a dream of mine and Kim's to give back to Cedar Rapids in a long-lasting, meaningful way."

Professional wins (26)

PGA Tour wins (12)

PGA Tour playoff record (4–1)

Nationwide Tour wins (2)

Nationwide Tour playoff record (1–1)

NGA Hooters Tour wins (4)
2001 3 events
2002 1 event

Prairie Golf Tour wins (3)
1998 1 event
1999 2 events

Other wins (5)

Other playoff record (1–0)

Major championships

Wins (2)

1Defeated Leishman and Oosthuizen in a four-hole aggregate playoff: Johnson (3-3-5-4=15), Oosthuizen (3-4-5-4=16), Leishman (5-4-5-4=18)

Results timeline

Results not in chronological order in 2020.

CUT = missed the halfway cut
"T" = tied
NT = No tournament due to COVID-19 pandemic

Summary

Most consecutive cuts made – 10 (2017 U.S. Open – 2019 U.S. Open)
Longest streak of top-10s – 2 (2013 Open Championship – 2013 PGA)

Results in The Players Championship

CUT = missed the halfway cut
"T" indicates a tie for a place
C = Canceled after the first round due to the COVID-19 pandemic

Results in World Golf Championships
Results not in chronological order prior to 2015.

QF, R16, R32, R64 = Round in which player lost in match play
"T" = tied
Note that the HSBC Champions did not become a WGC event until 2009.

PGA Tour career summary

* As of the 2020 season.

U.S. national team appearances
Professional
World Cup: 2005
Ryder Cup: 2006, 2010, 2012, 2014, 2016 (winners)
Wendy's 3-Tour Challenge (representing PGA Tour): 2006 (winners)
Presidents Cup: 2007 (winners), 2009 (winners), 2013 (winners), 2015 (winners)

See also

2003 Nationwide Tour graduates
List of golfers with most PGA Tour wins

Footnotes

References

External links

Augusta.com - Out of the Ordinary - profile - April 6, 2008
Golf.com - Zach Johnson is the talk of the town - April 2008
Xavier Foundation.org - Zach Johnson - Fall 2004

American male golfers
PGA Tour golfers
Winners of men's major golf championships
Ryder Cup competitors for the United States
Korn Ferry Tour graduates
Golfers from Iowa
Golfers from Florida
Golfers from Georgia (U.S. state)
Drake University alumni
Southern Baptists
Converts to Baptist denominations from Roman Catholicism
Baptists from Iowa
Baptists from Florida
Baptists from Georgia (U.S. state)
Sportspeople from Iowa City, Iowa
Sportspeople from Cedar Rapids, Iowa
Sportspeople from Seminole County, Florida
People from Lake Mary, Florida
People from St. Simons, Georgia
1976 births
Living people